Pastoralia is short story writer George Saunders’s second full-length short story collection, published in 2000. The collection received highly positive reviews from book critics and was ranked the fifth-greatest book of the 2000s by literary magazine The Millions. The book consists of stories that appeared (sometimes in different forms) in The New Yorker; most of the stories were O. Henry Award Prize Stories. The collection was a New York Times Notable Book for 2001.

Reception
Pastoralia received general acclaim from book critics. Chris Lehmann of Salon praised its relevance, calling Saunders a "master of distilling the disorders of our time into fiction." Lynne Tillman of The New York Times argued the stories "cover larger, more exciting territory" than Saunders' previous works, "with an abundance of ideas, meanings and psychological nuance." Pastoralia is also well-known for its writing style, which has been described as deadpan, realist, and/or postmodern. Iranian-American novelist and essayist Porochista Khakpour cited the "seamless coexistence of high and low" in the book's prose. A writer for Nylon argued the book's deadpan delivery and "satiric vision of contemporary America [secures Saunders'] place" as a successor to 20th century literary realists such as Thomas Pynchon and Kurt Vonnegut.

In 2007, Entertainment Weekly ranked the book #63 on its list of the top 100 works of literature since 1983. The following year, Emily VanDerWerff of The A.V. Club ranked it one of the ten best short story collections of the 2000s.

Contents

Awards, honors and other appearances
 "Pastoralia" was an O. Henry Award Prize Story in 2001.
 "Winky" Was an O. Henry Award Prize Story in 1998.
 "Sea Oak" was an O. Henry Award Prize Story in 1999. It was nominated for the 1999 Bram Stoker Award. It was also reprinted in Feeling Very Strange: The Slipstream Anthology, edited by James Patrick Kelly and John Kessel; it was also reprinted in American Fantastic Tales: Terror and the Uncanny from the 1940s to Now, edited by Peter Straub.
 "The Falls" was an O. Henry Award Prize Story in 1997.

Influence
 The eponymous story inspired the GEICO Cavemen ad campaign.

References

2001 short story collections
American short story collections
Riverhead Books books
Postmodern novels